Northolt is a station on the London Underground Central line in Northolt in the London Borough of Ealing. It is in Travelcard Zone 5 and between Greenford and South Ruislip stations.

History
The Great Western Railway constructed a halt just to the east of this location named Northolt Halt in 1907, on their "New North Main Line" (now the Acton–Northolt line) to Birmingham. It was renamed Northolt (for West End) Halt, before gaining station status under its original shorter name. It was closed in 1948 when the Central line was extended on a new pair of tracks from North Acton, the current Northolt tube station opening on the opposite side of the road bridge on 21 November 1948. The opening had been planned to be in the 1930s but was delayed by World War II.

The station today
The station has an island platform with passenger access down from the booking hall. Trains terminating at the station may use either a turnback siding west of the platforms to leave the running lines and run eastwards later or a crossover east of the station for more immediate return to central London.

In 2018, it was announced that the station would gain step free access by 2022, as part of a £200m investment to increase the number of accessible stations on the Tube.

North of the Central line tracks there is the singled track of the Acton–Northolt line from Paddington which is now used by freight trains and a single daily passenger "parliamentary service" (operated by Chiltern Railways) between Paddington and Gerrards Cross. There are no longer any platforms on this line.

Gallery

Transport links
London bus routes 90, 120, 140, 282, 395, E10, X140, and night route N7.

References

Central line (London Underground) stations
Tube stations in the London Borough of Ealing
Railway stations in Great Britain opened in 1948
Tube stations